OTO Award Female Singer

Currently held by  Kristína

First awarded  | Last awarded 2000 | Present  

OTO Award for Female Singer has been awarded since the first edition of the accolades, established by Art Production Agency (APA) in Slovakia. Each year, the award is presented to the most recognized female artists of the past year with the ceremony permitted live by the national television network STV.

Winners and nominees

2000s

2010s

Superlatives

References

External links
 OTO Awards (Official website)
 OTO Awards - Winners and nominees (From 2000 onwards)
 OTO Awards - Winners and nominees (From 2000 to 2009)

Singer, female
Slovak culture
Slovak television awards
Awards established in 2000
Music awards honoring women